WRXL (102.1 FM "Alt 102-1") is a commercial radio station licensed to Richmond, Virginia, and serving Central Virginia. WRXL is owned and operated by Audacy, Inc. WRXL airs an alternative rock radio format.

Studios, offices and the transmitter tower are on Basie Road in Richmond.   The station carries the syndicated Elliot in the Morning show, produced by Premiere Networks and originating at former sister station WWDC-FM in Washington, D.C.

History

Early years as WRNL-FM
On March 4, 1949, the station signed on the air as WRNL-FM.  It was the FM sister station to WRNL, owned by the Richmond Radio Corporation, a subsidiary of The Richmond News Leader newspaper (hence the WRNL-FM call sign). At first, WRNL-FM simulcast its AM counterpart, carrying the ABC Radio schedule of dramas, comedies, sports and news. In the late 1950s, WRNL-AM-FM moved to a full service format of middle of the road music, news, sports and talk.

In the 1960s, several Richmond FM stations received permission from the Federal Communications Commission for unusually high power.  Today, Richmond is in Zone 1, limited to a maximum of 50,000 watts effective radiated power (ERP). Before these rules were put into place, WRNL-FM was permitted to go to 120,000 watts, WFMV (now WURV) went to 74,000 watts and, to this day, WRVQ (then WRVA-FM) runs at 200,000 watts.

Switch to rock as WRXL
In 1971, WRNL-AM-FM were bought by Rust Communications, which owned a number of radio stations around the country. Rust decided to give WRNL-FM its own format. It hired a staff of young DJs, stopped simulcasting the AM station and switched to progressive rock.  To give the station a fresh identity, in 1973, the call sign was changed to WRXL. By 1980, the station's music had moved to an album rock direction, based on playing the biggest selling rock artists.

In 1993, WRVH (the new name of WRNL) and WRXL were sold to Clear Channel Communications, a forerunner of iHeartMedia, Inc., for $9.75 million.

Move to alternative rock

In 2002, the station slowly started to move their format from album rock/ Mainstream rock to an alternative metal style of Active rock as "102-1 The X" as their music programing was changed intentionally to compete against Cox Media's Alternative rock rival, WDYL, well known as Y101 during that time of format transition. WRXL would still have a larger coverage area than conventional Class B FM stations, but with lower power due to the increased antenna height. On October 1, 2012, WRXL rebranded from "102-1 The X" back to "XL 102", WRXL's branding from 1976 to 2002.

On November 1, 2017, iHeartMedia announced that WRXL, along with all of its co-owned stations in Richmond and Chattanooga, would be swapped to Entercom, coupled with that company's merger with CBS Radio. The sale was completed on December 19, 2017.  The deal had iHeartMedia taking over several former CBS and Entercom stations in Boston and Seattle in exchange for the Richmond and Chattanooga stations.

On September 13, 2020, WRXL quietly re-branded as "Alt 102-1" as part of a systemic "revamping" of Entercom's alternative rock stations. At this time, most of the local DJs and programming staff were laid off and replaced with out-of-market hosts.

HD Radio
WRXL also broadcasts an HD subchannel:
WRXL-HD2 carries a country music format branded as "Big 98.5," which feeds the co-owned translator station W253BI at 98.5 FM. The station premiered July 27, 2015.

References

External links

RXL
Modern rock radio stations in the United States
Radio stations established in 1949
1949 establishments in Virginia
Audacy, Inc. radio stations